Kimosina is a subgenus of flies belonging to the family Lesser Dung flies.

Species
P. antillensis Marshall in Marshall & Smith, 1992
P. antipoda (Roháček, 1984)
P. bicalyx Marshall in Marshall & Smith, 1992
P. bicornis Su & Liu, 2009
P. cercipilis Marshall in Marshall & Smith, 1992
P. chilenica (Duda, 1925)
P. ciliata (Duda, 1918)
P. digiseta Marshall in Marshall & Smith, 1992
P. digistylus Marshall in Marshall & Smith, 1992
P. emarginata Marshall, 2009
P. glabrescens (Villeneuve, 1917)
P. levigena (Spuler, 1925)
P. lineasterna Marshall in Marshall & Smith, 1992
P. lobocercus Marshall in Marshall & Smith, 1992
P. longisetosa (Dahl, 1909)
P. luteocercus Marshall in Marshall & Smith, 1992
P. luteofrons Marshall in Marshall & Smith, 1992
P. merida Marshall in Marshall & Smith, 1992
P. mulroneyi Marshall in Marshall & Smith, 1992
P. nigrifacies Marshall in Marshall & Smith, 1992
P. notthomasi Marshall in Marshall & Smith, 1992
P. obunca Marshall in Marshall & Smith, 1992
P. occimosa Marshall in Marshall & Smith, 1992
P. ovicercus Marshall in Marshall & Smith, 1992
P. plesiocercus Marshall, 2009
P. plumosula (Rondani, 1880)
P. sicana (Munari, 1988)
P. soikai (Munari, 1990)
P. spinicalyx Marshall in Marshall & Smith, 1992
P. squamosa Marshall in Marshall & Winchester, 1999
P. thomasi (Harrison, 1959)

References

Sphaeroceridae
Diptera of Asia
Diptera of Europe
Diptera of North America
Diptera of South America
Diptera of Australasia
Insect subgenera